St John the Baptist's Church is an Anglican church in Hove, part of the English city of Brighton and Hove.  It was built between 1852 and 1854 to serve the community of the Brunswick area of Hove, which had originally been established in the 1830s.

History
The land on which the Brunswick estate was built was originally a farming estate known as Wick Farm.  It was sold to Thomas Read Kemp, who had been responsible for the Kemp Town residential development in neighbouring Brighton, in 1825.  Some houses had been built the previous year, and Read Kemp is believed to have planned to create a similar exclusive development on this land; but little happened until after it had been sold to the Jewish baronet Sir Isaac Lyon Goldsmid in 1830.  Even then, it took another 20 years for the scheme to be altered and started properly.

Brunswick Town eventually consisted of 150 houses, many of which were exclusive and expensive, but there was no suitable church nearby.  Hove's original parish church, St Andrew's, was difficult to reach, while the nearest church on the way to Brighton, also called St Andrew's, was small.  Goldsmid therefore provided some land for a church to be built, near what would become the northwest corner of Palmeira Square.

The decision to proceed with construction was taken by the diocese on 21 March 1851, and work started on 15 April 1852 after £4,500 had been raised through borrowings, private donations and a grant.  Dr Ashurst Gilbert, the Bishop of Chichester, consecrated the new church on 24 June 1854.

Architecture
The architects William and Edward Habershon, brothers who operated as a partnership, designed the church in the Decorated Gothic style using flint and stone dressings.  The cruciform building has a tower at the eastern end; this was added in about 1870, as was the spire.  The lancet windows have tracery in the Decorated style.  A porch was added on the west side in 1906–07 by London-based architectural firm Rogers, Bone & Cole.

The church today
St John the Baptist's Church was listed at Grade II on 12 April 1983.  As of February 2001, it was one of 1,124 buildings listed at that grade in Brighton and Hove; the status indicates that the building is considered "nationally important and of special interest".

As well as two Eucharist services on Sundays, there is a weekly Holy Communion service using the official 1662 version of the Book of Common Prayer, a monthly Communion service following the Celtic tradition, a film-based discussion group, children's activities and a Sunday school.

Gallery

See also
Grade II listed buildings in Brighton and Hove: S
 List of places of worship in Brighton and Hove

Notes

Bibliography

Grade II listed churches in East Sussex
Churches completed in 1854
19th-century Church of England church buildings
St John
St John
1854 establishments in England